Prozone Mall is one of the largest, as well as one of the first horizontally designed shopping malls in India.

Overview
It is a two floor (ground + 1st level) structure. The mall was inaugurated on 8 October 2010 by Hrithik Roshan.

Prozone Aurangabad has more than 150 retail stores selling top local and international brands, a five-screen cinema complex,  family entertainment centre and 3000 parking bays. There are also plans to build an office complex above the centre. A business-class hotel will be constructed to compliment the precinct. Additionally, high rise apartments and row bungalows are constructed parallel to the mall.

Anchor tenants
Inox Cineplexes operates a five screen multiplex at Prozone.

References

External links

 Prozone Mall Aurangabad Website

Buildings and structures in Aurangabad, Maharashtra
Shopping malls in Maharashtra
Tourist attractions in Aurangabad district, Maharashtra
2010 establishments in Maharashtra
Shopping malls established in 2010